Tipula georgiana is a species of cranefly.

Distribution
Eastern United States.

References

 

Tipulidae
Diptera of North America
Insects described in 1915